Shay Gap Airport  is located near Shay Gap, in the Pilbara region of Western Australia.

See also
 List of airports in Western Australia
 Aviation transport in Australia

References

External links
Airservices Aerodromes & Procedure Charts

Pilbara airports